Music journalism in Pakistan has grown especially with the growth of the country's pop music industry and scene.
 
Popular music journalism was uncommon in the country until about 1985 when the Karachi based tabloid The Star started printing reviews written by Farrukh Moriani who is also considered to be the country's first ever pop music critic.

At the end of the 1980s and with the coming of the Liberal government of Benazir Bhutto in 1988, the once repressed and frowned upon (by the Islamist dictatorship of General Mohammad Zia-ul-Haq), Pakistani pop music emerged from the underground and started gaining mainstream popularity.

With this came another pioneering Pakistani music and fashion critic Fifi Haroon who was amongst the first in the country to undertake full features on the growing local music scene. Another frontrunner in this regard was M. Ali Tim. The arrival of Nadeem F. Paracha in 1990 also helped boost music journalism in Pakistan. With Paracha was Farjad Nabi (at The News International) and Aysha Aslam (at the Herald). Instep, the entertainment section of The News, also began to do regular features on the Pakistani music industry and has extensively covered Pakistani releases and artists ever since, with journalists like Maheen Sabeeh and Sameen Amer writing about the music scene. Dawn newspaper's section Images also carries features on the music industry. The Express Tribune features writers such as Rafay Mehmood and Sher Khan writing about the industry. Nayha Jehangir Khan has written on the scene for Youlin Magazine. Ally Adnan is another name who contributes to many publications particularly Daily Times.

Music Mafia Information Services from Karachi published Pakistan's debut music periodical calling it FMM, the First Music Magazine. It was the brainchild of Muhammad Nadeem Sherwani together with Mussadiq Baig and Sharique X, with generous support from renowned photographer Nadeem A.Khan and Pakistan International Graphic LTD. Phaser is another music magazine in Pakistan.

See also
Fasi Zaka
NFP clones
Muniba Kamal
Bandbaja
The News International
Music Critics

 
Mass media in Pakistan